Dacalana mio is a butterfly of the family Lycaenidae first described by Hisakazu Hayashi, Heinz G. Schroeder and Colin G. Treadaway in 1983. Forewing length: 16–18 mm. It is rare species, endemic to the Philippines and found only on the islands of Mindanao and Leyte.

References

, 1983: Neue Arten und Unterarten der Gattungen Dacalana und Pratapa von den Philippinen (Insecta: Lepidoptera: Lycaenidae). Senckenbergiana Biologica. 63 (1/2): 47-59.
, 1995: Checklist of the butterflies of the Philippine Islands (Lepidoptera: Rhopalocera). Nachrichten des Entomologischen Vereins Apollo, Suppl. 14: 7-118.

, 2012: Revised checklist of the butterflies of the Philippine Islands (Lepidoptera: Rhopalocera). Nachrichten des Entomologischen Vereins Apollo, Suppl. 20: 1-64.

Butterflies described in 1983
Dacalana